Haftian (also Romanized as Haftīān) is a village in Rudbar Rural District, in the Central District of Tafresh County, Markazi Province, Iran. At the 2006 census, its population was 110, in 31 families.

References 

Populated places in Tafresh County